The 1982–83 IHF Women's Cup Winners' Cup was the seventh edition of IHF's competition for European women's handball national cup champions. It was contested by 20 teams, two more than the previous edition.

Defending champion RK Osijek defeated SC Magdeburg on away goals in the final to win its second European trophy, becoming the first Cup Winners' Cup champion to successfully defend the title.

Results

References

Women's EHF Cup Winners' Cup
1982 in handball
1983 in handball